The Elswick was an English automobile produced in Newcastle upon Tyne from 1903 until 1907.  

It was a car built mainly from bought-in parts. The front featured a round radiator.

In 1904 the range offered included a 6 hp single-cylinder model with De Dion-Bouton engine, a 20 hp with Brouhot 4-cylinder and 24 hp with a Mutel engine. By 1906 the 20 and 24 hp models seem to have been dropped and alongside the 6 hp single were the four-cylinder 15/20 hp and 24/30 hp and a six-cylinder engine of 26/30 hp. Towards the end of production, manufacture might have moved to London.

See also
 List of car manufacturers of the United Kingdom

References

Defunct motor vehicle manufacturers of England
Companies based in Newcastle upon Tyne